Stephen Markley is an American journalist and author, whose work includes memoirs and novels. His first novel Ohio takes place during a single evening. His second novel The Deluge is a dystopian epic which spans the years 2013 through to the 2030s.

Personal life
Stephen Markley was born in Ohio and is a graduate of the Iowa Writers' Workshop.

Books
Source: WorldCat

Nonfiction
Publish This Book (2010)
The Great Dysmorphia (2012)
Tales of Iceland (2013)

Fiction
Ohio (2018)
The Deluge (2023)

References

External links
 Official Website

Year of birth missing (living people)
Living people
21st-century American novelists
American male novelists